Baley is a town and the administrative center of Baleysky District in Zabaykalsky Krai, Russia, located on the Unda River (Amur's basin),  east of Chita, the administrative center of the krai. Population:

History
Baley was granted town status and received its name in 1938, when the gold mining settlement of Novotroitsk was transformed.

The Baleylag prison camp of the gulag was constructed here to house prisoners used as slave labor for mining the Tasseyevskoye gold deposits discovered in 1947.

Administrative and municipal status
Within the framework of administrative divisions, Baley serves as the administrative center of Baleysky District, to which it is directly subordinated. As a municipal division, the town of Baley is incorporated within Baleysky Municipal District as Baley Urban Settlement.

Economy
The town's economy remains reliant on gold mining, with numerous shafts, an open-cut mine, and processing facilities. Since 2004, exploitation of the gold deposits has been under the control of Canada company Barrick Gold.

Transportation
The town is served by the Baley Airport.

References

Notes

Sources

External links
Official website of Baley 
Directory of organizations in Baley 

Cities and towns in Zabaykalsky Krai
1938 establishments in the Soviet Union